The Liberty District is a high school district in the state of Virginia that includes schools from Northern Virginia.

About the district
The Liberty District was founded in 1993 as part of an attempted realignment of the AAA Northern Region.  The charter members were all Fairfax County schools, including: Fairfax, Falls Church, George C. Marshall, James Madison, Langley, McLean and Robert E. Lee.

Member changes
The Liberty District has experienced the most change of the four Northern Region districts. In 1996, the Liberty District moved Falls Church to the National District to reunite it with its primary rival J.E.B. Stuart, but added Broad Run and Park View High Schools of Loudoun County who played in the Northwestern District. When a new Loudoun County high school opened in 1997, both Broad Run and Park View were AA size again and moved down to AA in 1999, but Woodson was added to reunite it against its rival Fairfax. In 2003, South Lakes joined the district, bringing the Liberty back to eight teams.

In 2005, the Liberty went through a significant change by removing charter members Fairfax and Lee to the Concorde and Patriot Districts respectively. Its geography expanded considerably eastward and westward by adding Jefferson of Alexandria from the Concorde and Stone Bridge of Ashburn from the AA Dulles District. In 2009, Fairfax returned to the district, but W.T. Woodson moved to the Patriot District. In 2015, Stone Bridge left the district and moved into the new Potomac District and Thomas Jefferson along with Marshall went to the National District. But added Arlington schools Washington-Liberty, and Yorktown.

Membership history

Current members
George Marshall Statesmen of Falls Church 
Herndon Hornets of Herndon
Langley Saxons of McLean
McLean Highlanders of McLean
Wakefield Warriors of Arlington
Washington-Liberty Generals of Arlington
Yorktown Patriots of Arlington

Former members
Broad Run Spartans of Ashburn (1996-1999)
Fairfax Rebels of Fairfax (1993-2005, 2009-2017)
Falls Church Jaguars of Falls Church (1993-1996)
George C. Marshall Statesmen of Falls Church (1993-2015)
James Madison Warhawks of Vienna (1993-2017)
Park View Patriots of Sterling (1996-1999)
Robert E. Lee Lancers of Springfield (1993-2005) now John R. Lewis
South Lakes Seahawks of Reston (2003-2021)
Stone Bridge Bulldogs of Ashburn (2005-2015)
W.T. Woodson Cavaliers of Fairfax (1999-2009)

References 

Virginia High School League
1993 establishments in Virginia